James Culbreath Getzen Jr. (March 8, 1904 – April 19, 1970) was an American politician in the state of Florida.

He served in the Florida State Senate from 1947 to 1949 and 1955 to 1961 as a Democratic member for the 38th district. He also served in the Florida House of Representatives, from 1937 to 1949, and 1951 to 1955 for Sumter County.

References

1904 births
1970 deaths
Democratic Party members of the Florida House of Representatives
Democratic Party Florida state senators
Pork Chop Gang
20th-century American politicians